The 2015 European Canoe Slalom Championships took place in Markkleeberg, Germany under the auspices of the European Canoe Association (ECA). It was the 16th edition of the competition and took place at the Kanupark Markkleeberg artificial course from 28th-31 May 2015.

Medal summary

Men's results

Canoe

Kayak

Women's results

Canoe

Kayak

Medal table

References

External links
 European Canoe Association
 2015 ECA Canoe Slalom European Championships Markkleeberg

European Canoe Slalom Championships
European Canoe Slalom Championships
European Canoe Slalom Championships
Markkleeberg
Sport in Saxony
Canoeing and kayaking competitions in Germany